Filopaludina bengalensis, also known as Bellamya bengalensis, is a species of large freshwater snail with a gill and an operculum, an aquatic gastropod mollusk in the family Viviparidae.

Distribution 
This species is found in Iran, Nepal, Myanmar,  Bangladesh.

Ecology
Parasites of Filopaludina bengalensis include trematode Lissemysia ocellata and Lissemysia ovata.

Human use 
It is used as a food source for humans.

References

External links

Viviparidae
Taxobox binomials not recognized by IUCN
Gastropods described in 1822